Andrea Sammaritani (born 30 November 1957) is a Sammarinese cross-country skier. He competed at the 1984 Winter Olympics, the 1988 Winter Olympics and the 1992 Winter Olympics.

References

1957 births
Living people
Sammarinese male cross-country skiers
Olympic cross-country skiers of San Marino
Cross-country skiers at the 1984 Winter Olympics
Cross-country skiers at the 1988 Winter Olympics
Cross-country skiers at the 1992 Winter Olympics
Sportspeople from Rimini